Russian Super League may refer to several sports leagues in Russia:
Russian Superleague, an ice hockey league
Russian Bandy Super League, the top Russian bandy league
Russian Basketball Super League, a basketball league
Professional Rugby League, a rugby union competition formerly known as Superleague
Russian Volleyball Super League, a volleyball league